Manjunath Nayaker is an Indian actor and public relations professional. He is better known by his screen name Master Manjunath and "Swamy" for his lead role in the television series Malgudi Days (1987) directed by Shankar Nag and in its film version, Swami And Friends.

Early life
Nayaker was born in Bangalore, Karnataka, India. He gained a Bachelor of Arts degree in English and a Master of Arts degree in Sociology from Mysore University and Bangalore University. He also holds a Diploma in cinematography and CA Foundation course.

Career
Master Manjunath, who started acting at age three, has been part of 68 movies in Kannada, Telugu and Hindi, but it was his role in Swami and Friends that fetched him recognition, in addition to six international, one national and a state award. The series was shot during his school vacation in 1985–86, and telecast in 1987. He acted in Super Hit movies of actor-director Shankar Nag such as Nodi Swamy Navirodu Hige, Sangliana and S.P. Sangliana 2. He also played the role of young Vijay Deenanath Chauhan in Agneepath (1990), which starred Amitabh Bachchan. He later co-starred alongside Mammootty in the 1992 Telugu film Swati Kiranam.

He quit acting at the age of 19 to concentrate on his studies.

He became a PR professional and has been working for the Bangalore – Mysore Infrastructure Corridor Project (BMICP).

Personal life
Manjunath is married to athlete Swarnarekha, a sprinter and long jumper.

Filmography

References

External links
 

Indian male television actors
Male actors in Kannada cinema
Indian male film actors
Indian male child actors
Male actors in Hindi cinema
Living people
20th-century Indian male actors
Male actors from Bangalore
Male actors in Telugu cinema
Male actors in Hindi television
Best Child Artist National Film Award winners
Year of birth missing (living people)